Daniel Pieter 'Neil' Knobel  (29 November 1936 - 22 July 2021) was a South African military commander. A medical doctor, he was Surgeon-General, in command of the South African Medical Service, from 1988 to 1997.

Medical career
Knobel was born in Edinburgh, Scotland in 1936. Educated at the Afrikaans Boys High School in Pretoria, South Africa, he graduated with an MD and as specialist anatomist at the University of Edinburgh in Scotland in 1966. After being involved in academic medicine as a teacher of anatomy to approximately 20,000 students of all health professions in both Scotland and South Africa, he retired as Professor and Head of the Anatomy Department at the University of Pretoria, South Africa in 1979.

Having served for 13 years (from 1966 to 1979) as a Medical Officer, in various staff and operational positions in the part-time forces of the South African Defence Force, he joined the Permanent Force as Chief of Staff Medical Operations, with the rank of Brigadier in 1980. During the period 1980 to 1988, he obtained the Command and Staff and Joint Staff qualifications of the SADF, and served in various capacities in numerous operations in the RSA, South West Africa, Angola and Mozambique. In 1988 he was appointed Surgeon General of the SADF with the rank of lieutenant general.

During his term of office he was responsible for the medical care of four successive State Presidents of the RSA, all foreign dignitaries, as well as providing a specialized supporting service to all the security services and the Department of Health in South Africa.  He also commanded the secretive South African chemical and biological weapons program, known as Project Coast from 1988 to 1998.

Honours and awards
He officially visited 160 military and scientific installations in 14 countries, received 21 honours and awards and was decorated on seven occasions. In particular the Order of the Star of South Africa (Silver) was conferred on him by the State President of the RSA in 1992 and in 1994, Queen Elizabeth II sanctioned his promotion to Knight of the Order of St John.

Medal List

Professional recognition
He is the author/co-author of 72 academic, military and/or scientific publications and is associated with 45 professional societies/organizations. With a special devotion to the needs of the disabled, he established the Curamus Association and Curamus Monument, for serving and ex-serving members of the Security Services of the RSA in 1989 and was awarded the World Veterans Fund Rehabilitation Prize for his work in this regard in 2000.

See also
List of South African military chiefs
South African Medical Service

References

1936 births
2021 deaths
Military personnel from Edinburgh
South African military doctors
White South African people
South African military personnel of the Border War
Knights of the Order of St John
Alumni of the University of Edinburgh